The Korean Association of Film Critics Awards, also known as the Critics Choice Awards, is an annual awards ceremony for excellence in film in South Korea. It was established in 1980 by the Korean Association of Film Critics (KAFC). The ceremony is usually held in November or December.

Categories
Best Film
Best Director
Best Actor
Best Actress
Best Supporting Actor
Best Supporting Actress
Best New Director
Best New Actor
Best New Actress
Best Screenplay
Best Cinematography
Best Music
Technical Award is given to achievement in visual effects, editing, art direction, lighting, or costume design
CJ CGV Star Award
Special Mention
Special Achievement Award
FIPRESCI Award (International Federation of Film Critics, Korean branch)
Best New Critic
Best Foreign Film
Award for Contribution to Cinema

Best Film

Best Director

Best Actor

Best Actress

Best Supporting Actor

Best Supporting Actress

Best New Director

Best New Actor

Best New Actress

Best Screenplay

Best Cinematography

Best Music

Technical Award

Best Independent Film Maker

FIPRESCI Award

Special Mention

Lifetime achievement award

Award for Contribution to Cinema

Other Awards

Best New Critic

Best Foreign Film

References

External links
 
Korean Association of Film Critics Awards at Naver 
Korean Association of Film Critics Awards at Daum 

South Korean film awards
Awards established in 1980
Annual events in South Korea
1980 establishments in South Korea